163rd meridian may refer to:

163rd meridian east, a line of longitude east of the Greenwich Meridian
163rd meridian west, a line of longitude west of the Greenwich Meridian